Alison Monica Halford (born 8 May 1940) is a former senior police officer who became a politician. She was Labour member of the National Assembly for Wales, representing the Delyn constituency, between 1999 and 2003. In 2006 she transferred allegiance to the Conservative Party and as of 2007 advises the Conservatives on home affairs.

Early life
Halford was born in Norwich on 8 May 1940. She attended a Catholic grammar school.

She served for three years in the Women's Royal Air Force, before moving to London to train as a dental hygienist.

Police career
In 1962, Halford joined the Metropolitan Police. She rose rapidly in the police. She became a Detective Constable soon after completing her probation, joined a fast track promotion scheme, and was promoted to Inspector in 1967. She reached the rank of Chief Superintendent in the Metropolitan Police, and was the first woman in the country to command a police division, taking command of Tottenham Court Road police station.

In 1983, she became Assistant Chief Constable of Merseyside Police, the first woman to hold that rank in British police history, the first woman outside the Metropolitan Police to hold Chief Officer rank and the highest-ranking female police officer in the UK at the time. She claimed to have faced sexual discrimination in her new post, however, and did not get on well with Chief Constable Kenneth Oxford. Despite repeated attempts she failed to win further promotion, after which she brought a sexual discrimination claim. The claim was withdrawn following a settlement between the two parties. She retired in 1992.

Political career
On 10 April 2006 she announced that she was joining the Conservatives, having grown increasingly disillusioned with the Labour Party. She especially cited the appointment of Peter Mandelson as a European Commissioner. She became an adviser to the Conservative Party and their Shadow Secretary of State for Wales on home affairs.

During 2010 it emerged that she was under investigation for allegedly bullying the then council leader.

In 2012 she was re-elected as a Conservative County Councillor for Flintshire County Council and as a Conservative Community Councillor for Hawarden Community Council.

Personal life
In 1997, the European Court of Human Rights awarded her £10,000 under art. 13 of the European Convention on Human Rights against the UK in respect of telephone tapping committed by the Merseyside Police in order to find evidence to dispute her sexual discrimination complaint – this violated her art. 8 right to respect for private life.

Publications
Halford then wrote a book about her experiences, entitled No Way Up the Greasy Pole. Halford launched her book 'Leeks from the Backbenches' at the Welsh Assembly on 6 November 2007.

References

External links
 Alison's musings - personal blog
 BBC biography of Alison Halford

1940 births
Living people
Welsh Labour members of the Senedd
Conservative Party (UK) politicians
Members of Flintshire County Council
British police chief officers
British women police officers
Women Metropolitan Police officers
Women Merseyside Police officers
Wales AMs 1999–2003
Women's Royal Air Force airwomen
Metropolitan Police officers
Women councillors in Wales